Noel Borshi (born 13 February 1996 in Rome, Italy) is an Albanian swimmer who competed in the 2012 Summer Olympics. She also competed at the 2013 Mediterranean Games, where her best result was tenth place in women's 100 metre butterfly.

Major Results

Individual

Long course

References

1996 births
Living people
Swimmers from Rome
Albanian female swimmers
Female butterfly swimmers
Olympic swimmers of Albania
Swimmers at the 2012 Summer Olympics
Swimmers at the 2014 Summer Youth Olympics
Swimmers at the 2013 Mediterranean Games
Italian people of Albanian descent
Mediterranean Games competitors for Albania
20th-century Albanian women
21st-century Albanian women